Henri, Adrien, Barthélemy, Louis Rieunier (6 March 1833, Castelsarrasin – 10 July 1918, Albi) was a French admiral and politician, most notable for his involvement in Vietnam.

External links
http://www.culture.gouv.fr/public/mistral/leonore_fr?ACTION=CHERCHER&FIELD_1=COTE&VALUE_1=LH%2F2328%2F27

1833 births
1918 deaths
French Navy admirals
French Naval Ministers